David Wynne  (25 May 1926 – 4 September 2014) was a British sculptor of figures, animals, and portraits.

Biography
Born in Lyndhurst, Hampshire, son of Commander Charles Edward Wynne and Millicent (née Beyts), Wynne was educated at Stowe School and then served in the Royal Navy during World War II and read Zoology at Trinity College, Cambridge, taking up sculpture professionally in 1950. He married Gillian Grant, daughter of the writer Joan Grant, in 1959 and had two sons, Edward and Roland, who formed psychedelic rock band Ozric Tentacles.

He did a bronze sculpture of The Beatles in 1964 and subsequently introduced them to the Maharishi Mahesh Yogi (of whom he also did a sculpture).

He was awarded the OBE in 1994.

Works

Wynne's sculptures include:
Bird Fountains (1967) – Ambassador College, Pasadena, California
Blessed Virgin Mary (2000) – Ely Cathedral
The Breath of Life Column (1962) – location unknown (was Hammersmith)
Boy with a Dolphin (1974) – Cheyne Walk
Christ and Mary Magdalene (1963) – Ely Cathedral and Magdalen College, Oxford
 Cresta Rider (1985) – Saint Moritz
Dancer with a Bird (1975) – Cadogan Square Gardens
The Dancers (1971) – Cadogan Square Gardens
Embracing Lovers (1973) – Guildhall, London
Five Swimmers Fountain (1980) – Staines
Fred Perry (1984) – Wimbledon Lawn Tennis Club, Southfields, London
Gaia and Tresco Children (1990) – Tresco Abbey Gardens
Girl on a Horse – Donald M. Kendall Sculpture Gardens, Purchase, New York
Girl with a Dolphin (1973) – by Tower Bridge
Girl with Doves (1970) – University of Arizona, Tucson, Arizona
Goddess of the Woods (1991) – Highgrove House
Gorilla (sculpture) (1961) – Crystal Palace Park, south London, a sculpture of Guy the Gorilla
Grizzly Bear – Donald M. Kendall Sculpture Gardens, Purchase, New York
Leaping Salmon (1980) – Kingston upon Thames
The Messenger (1981) – Sutton, London
Queen Elizabeth Gate (1992) – Hyde Park Corner
Risen Christ and Seraphim (1985) – Wells Cathedral
River God Tyne (1968) – Newcastle Civic Centre
The Spirit of Fire (1963) – originally Lewis's, later Debenhams, Hanley, Staffordshire
Swans in Flight (1968) – Swans In Flight, Armstrong Auditorium, Edmond, Oklahoma
Teamwork (1958) – for Taylor Woodrow headquarters, London and later Solihull; now at Taywood Road, Northolt, London
UK 50 Pence Coin (1973) – Commemoration of the United Kingdom joining the European Economic Community
 ″Christ on the Ass″ (1954) Maquette III for The Entry into Jerusalem. 
Portraits include:
Maharishi Mahesh Yogi (1962)
Charles, Prince of Wales (1970)

 Joan Baez (1965)
John Gielgud (1962) – Royal Shakespeare Theatre, Stratford-upon-Avon
Oskar Kokoschka (1965) – Tate
Queen Elizabeth II
The Beatles (1964)
Thomas Beecham (1956) – Royal Festival Hall, National Portrait Gallery, London, etc.
Yehudi Menuhin (1963)

References

Further reading

External links 

http://www.telegraph.co.uk/culture/art/3617549/Object-of-the-week.html
http://www.ukwhoswho.com

1926 births
2014 deaths
British sculptors
British male sculptors
Officers of the Order of the British Empire
People from Lyndhurst, Hampshire
Alumni of Trinity College, Cambridge
People educated at Stowe School
Royal Navy personnel of World War II